Sergio Schulmeister (30 April 1977 – 4 February 2003) was an Argentine footballer who played as goalkeeper in some clubs in the Argentine Primera División.

He committed suicide by hanging on 4 February 2003, after surviving a first attempt on 25 September 2001.

References

1977 births
2003 deaths
Sportspeople from Buenos Aires Province
Argentine people of Volga German descent
Association football goalkeepers
Defensores de Belgrano footballers
Club Atlético Huracán footballers
Argentine Primera División players
2003 suicides
Argentine footballers

Suicides by hanging in Argentina
People from Coronel Suárez Partido